The Belle of New York is a 1919 silent film directed by Julius Steger and starring Marion Davies.

It survives incomplete in the Library of Congress collection missing several reels.

Cast 
 Marion Davies as Violet Gray
 Etienne Girardot
 L. Rogers Lytton as Amos Gray
 Franklyn Hanna
 Raymond Bloomer as Jack Bronson

Unbilled
 Christian Rub
 Barbara Sabin - Little Girl

References

External links 

1919 films
American silent feature films
1919 drama films
American black-and-white films
Silent American drama films
Selznick Pictures films
Films directed by Julius Steger
1910s American films